Gilbert William Arthur Duthie AM (21 May 1912 – 13 June 1998) was an Australian politician. Born in Nhill, Victoria, he was educated at state schools and at the University of Melbourne before becoming a schoolteacher and farmer in rural Victoria. In 1938 he was ordained a Methodist minister, and in 1944 he moved to Latrobe, Tasmania. In 1945 and 1946 Duthie was directly involved with Australian rules football in the town. He was secretary of the Latrobe Football Club as well as playing senior games for it in the NWFU competition.

In 1946, Gil Duthie was elected to the Australian House of Representatives as the Labor member for Wilmot, defeating sitting Liberal MP Allan Guy. From February 1956 until December 1972 he was the Labor Party Whip in the House. He held the seat until 1975, when he was defeated by Liberal candidate Max Burr. Duthie died in 1998.

References

Further reading
 Duthie, Gil (1984), I Had 50,000 Bosses. Memoirs of a Labor Backbencher 1946-1975, Angus and Robertson, Sydney. 

Australian Labor Party members of the Parliament of Australia
Members of the Australian House of Representatives for Wilmot
Members of the Australian House of Representatives
Members of the Order of Australia
1912 births
1998 deaths
Latrobe Football Club players
20th-century Australian politicians